The Department of Science and the Environment was an Australian government department that existed between December 1978 and November 1980.

Scope
Information about the department's functions and/or government funding allocation could be found in the Administrative Arrangements Orders, the annual Portfolio Budget Statements and in the Department's annual reports.

According to the National Archives of Australia, at its creation, the Department was responsible for:
Science and technology, including research, support of research and support of civil space research programs.
Environment and conservation
Meteorology
Ionospheric Prediction Service
Analytical laboratory Service
Weights and measures.

Structure
The Department was an Australian Public Service department, staffed by officials who were responsible to the Minister for Science and the Environment.

The Department was headed by a Secretary, John Farrands.

References

Science and the Environment
Australia